Casey Patricia Desmond (born June 25, 1986, in Boston, Massachusetts) is an American pop singer-songwriter and musician.

Biography 
Desmond was born in Boston, Massachusetts, to parents Bill and Katherine Desmond, two Boston musicians and founders of Bentmen, a local Boston band, and the Sound Museum Music Complex. She was a contestant on NBC's The Voice, on a team coached by Adam Levine of Maroon 5. She sang "Born This Way" by Lady Gaga during blind auditions. On the May 31, 2011, episode of The Voice, Desmond was the fourth member of Levine's team of eight to be eliminated after competing head to head with Jeff Jenkins. They performed Elton John's "Don't Let the Sun Go Down on Me".

Band members
Casey Desmond: vocals, guitar, keyboards
Taylor Barefoot: guitars

Discography 
Casey Desmond (2005)
No Disguise (2007)
Chilly Allston (2008)
Deja Vu (2012)

References 

1986 births
Living people
21st-century American women guitarists
21st-century American guitarists
21st-century American women singers
American child singers
American women pop singers
American women rock singers
American women singer-songwriters
American multi-instrumentalists
American rock guitarists
American rock songwriters
Guitarists from Massachusetts
Musicians from Boston
Singer-songwriters from Massachusetts
The Voice (franchise) contestants
21st-century American singers